The Unlisted is an Australian children's science fiction drama television series. The series follows the story of 12-year-old identical twins, Drupad and Kalpen Sharma, who work with a group of underground vigilante children, who call themselves "The Unlisted", in order to stop a powerful corporation from imposing global control over the world's youth by inserting a tracking device, which also allows to control them.

The Unlisted is produced by Polly Staniford and Angie Fielder. It is executive produced by Justine Flynn, Libbie Doherty and Carla De Jong. The creator and showrunner is Justine Flynn. The series is directed by Rhys Graham, Justine Flynn, Neil Sharma, Nick Verso, Lucy Gaffy and Rebecca O’Brien. It was written by Mithila Gupta, Timothy Lee, Tristram Baumber, Chris Kunz, Greg Waters, Jane Allen, Rhys Graham, Nicholas Brown, Natesha Somasundaram. It is an Aquarius Films production. Netflix has acquired global rights outside Australia. As of September 2022, the series has neither been officially canceled by Netflix, nor renewed for a second season.

Premise
The first season follows Twelve-year-old identical twins who discover that a corporation, along with the government, is secretly tracking and manipulating Australia's youth. It is being done via electronic tracking devices that are installed, under the name of Global Child Initiative Programme. When the duo discovers that the programme is all a sham, they pair up with a group of underground vigilantes, who call themselves as 'The Unlisted', to stop the powerful and evil corporation from gaining control over the world's youth. They must stop the wicked authorities from creating an army of young soldiers who can be manipulated to serve the wealthiest of society.

Cast and characters

Main
 Ved Rao as Kalpen "Kal" Sharma: a teenage boy attending middle school who is the twin brother of Drupal Sharma; he took his brother’s place in a 'dental appointment' at school, and ended up with two implants. He and Dru discover a deadly secret about the Global Child Initiative and have to work together to take them down before all is lost. Though Kal may not be as intelligent as Dru, he is very athletic and strategic. Kal is also shown to be extremely brave and loyal. However, after Kal gets implanted, his personality slowly begins to change as he starts to become manipulated by Infinity Group and Regan, losing his emotions for people. Because Kal got two implants, he gained double the ability compared to his classmates.
 Vrund Rao as Drupad "Dru" Sharma: twin brother of Kalpen Sharma. He is also a middle schooler like his brother and he is very intelligent. He knows how to code. When Kymara hides a secret message within her video to find other Unlisted kids he quickly figures it out using dark web. Because of his fears of dentists, he asked his brother to go in his place and due to that he has not been implanted so he lacks certain enhanced abilities that his brother and other classmates have.
 Miah Madden as Kymara Russell: a vlog streamer who likes posting gaming content for all her viewers. She is also a part of "The Unlisted". Due to her being famous, the other members of The Unlisted force her to hide back during certain plans and break her phone, to keep their location secret from the Infinity Group. Dru is also shown to be a fan of hers.
 Abigail Adriano as Rose Aquino: an Asian girl who is one of the Unlisted children that work together with twins Kal and Dru Sharma to take down the Global Child Initiative and put an end to their evil plans. 
 Nya Cofie as Jacob Annan: a teenager who  is one of the Unlisted children until he and his group. He is a very big fan of soccer and supports the same team as Kal. He got an infection after Kal beat him when he, along with other Unlisted children attacked Dru fearing the brothers may have been sent by the Infinity Group and had to be treated by Aunt Maya.
 Jean Hinchliffe as Gemma Khouri: a very kind and brave girl who grew up on a farm and cares a lot about her friends and others. She is also a part of the Unlisted because she was not implanted due to her having to help out at her father's farm.
 Zachary Wan as Jiao: a smart Chinese exchange student. He didn't take the implant and instead wears it in a pendant on his necklace so that the Global Child Initiative can't find him. Jiao first appears in Episode Six and appeared as an ally to the Unlisted as he is Unlisted himself. He stayed in Dru and Kal’s house.
 Kate Box as Emma Ainsworth: one of the main antagonists and leader of the Australian branch of the Infinity Group. She was also the leader of the Australian branch of the Global Child Initiative, an umbrella company of the Infinity Group.

Recurring
Saba Zaidi Abdi as Kal and Dru's dadi (grandmother): head of the Sharma family who values Indian Traditions.
Avishma Lohith as Vidya Sharma: older sister of Dru and Kal.
Annabel Wolfe as Regan Holcroft: classmate of the Sharma brothers who also got implanted.
Aria Ferris as Chloe: friend and neighbour of the Sharma brothers who is also implanted.
Otis Dhanji as Tim Hale: friend of Kal Sharma and the first victim to refuse the implantation.
Virginie Laverdure as Anousha Sharma: mother of Dru and Kal.
Nicholas Brown as Rahul Sharma: father of Dru and Kal and a bakery owner.
Zenia Starr as Dr. Maya Sharma: Kal and Dru's bua (aunt) .
Danny Kim as Mr. Park: teacher of Dru and Kal's class.
Suzi Dougherty as Ms. Biggs.
Kevin MacIsaac as Mr. Cunningham: an arrangement teacher who secretly works for the Infinity Group.
Carole Sharkey-Waters as a dentist who was implanting the tool under student's mouth.
Ben Toyer as a guard who works for Infinity Group.
Kaaran Watene as an officer who works for Global Child Initiative.
Angela Beal as a "super recogniser" trained in recognising faces who works for Infinity Group.

Episodes

Season 1 (2019)

Reception

Critical response
The first season has received generally positive reviews, with praise for the acting, directing, story, visuals and themes. Ruth Prarthana of Deccan Chronicle praised The Unlisted giving it a 4 out of 5, stating that "The Unlisted works because it offers only 15 episodes that capture the narrative in fast-paced manner with no needless drama." Reviewing for Common Sense Media, Ayize Everett wrote "This Australian drama is fairly light and fun, despite the overtones of menace."

The series has received some criticism also. Writing for Decider, John Serba praised some aspects of the series, including the theme song but was troubled by the performances of actors, writing, "It seems to be fishing around for a consistent tone ... Its modest stabs at comedy fall flat, and the serious moments fall prey to stiff dialogue and performances."

Accolades

Soundtrack

Track listing

References

External links 
 
 

Australian children's television series
Australian Broadcasting Corporation original programming
2010s teen drama television series
2019 Australian television series debuts
Television series about children
Television series about twins
Children's science fiction television series
Australian science fiction television series
2010s science fiction television series
English-language Netflix original programming
Fiction about mind control